The Music According to Antonio Carlos Jobim is a 2012 Brazilian documentary film, directed by Nelson Pereira dos Santos and Dora Jobim that tells the history of the singer and songwriter Tom Jobim.

Synopsis
The movie tells the story of one of the biggest names in Brazilian Music, Antônio Carlos Jobim, famous for songs like "Garota de Ipanema", "Chega de Saudade" e "Águas de Março". It shows the influence of classical music on his works and his partnership with Vinicius de Moraes.

References

External links
 
 

2012 documentary films
2012 films
Brazilian documentary films
Documentary films about singers
Films directed by Nelson Pereira dos Santos
Antônio Carlos Jobim
2010s Portuguese-language films